Fish Fillets NG, originally just Fish Fillets, is a puzzle video game developed and released by Altar Games in 1998. The game's goal is in each level to find a safe way out for both of the two fish. Fish Fillets is comparable to other sliding puzzle games such as sokoban and klotski, while it has a few additional elements and rules.

Gameplay

The game involves two fish, both controlled by the player, moving various objects and obstacles around until they may both safely exit the level. Unlike many other sliding puzzle games, this one has gravity, and an unsupported object will fall until it lands on something else. If an object falls onto one of the fish, it dies and the level cannot be completed unless restarted. One of the fish is larger, and only he may lift or push certain objects (steel objects), which adds another level of complication to the puzzles. Another important, complicating rule is that no object may be slid across the back of a fish, as this is considered to be the same as an object landing on a fish's back. However, a fish who is holding up an object may swim back and forth underneath it and an object may be slid exactly one unit off of a fish's back if it is moving onto solid support in the process. The game has background music and, on many levels, some animated effects, though neither normally has an effect on game play.

History 
The game was originally created by Czech video game developer Altar Games and released commercially in 1998. In 2002, it was relicensed and released under the GNU GPL-2.0-or-later on SourceForge. In 2004 fans created a new version ("Next Generation") based on the open-source release. The fan community ported the game to many other operating systems, created an extra branch of levels, and translated it to many languages.

Reception 
Fish Fillets was selected in March 2008 as "HotPick" by Linux Format.

Fish Fillets NG was downloaded between 2004 and May 2017 alone via SourceForge.net over 180,000 times.

References

External links
 Fish Fillets NG Home page on sourceforge.net

AmigaOS 4 games
Open-source video games
Linux games
MacOS games
Puzzle video games
Video games developed in the Czech Republic
Windows games
Android (operating system) games
Free and open-source Android software
Commercial video games with freely available source code
Video games with underwater settings